Aleksandr Sergeyevich Semyonov (born 11 June 1982) is a former Russian professional footballer.

External links 
 
 

1982 births
Living people
Russian footballers
Russian expatriate footballers
Expatriate footballers in Armenia
Expatriate footballers in Belarus
FC Shinnik Yaroslavl players
FC Amkar Perm players
FC Lokomotiv Nizhny Novgorod players
FC Mika players
FC Neman Grodno players
FC Belshina Bobruisk players
Armenian Premier League players
FC Dynamo Bryansk players
FC Granit Mikashevichi players
FC Smorgon players
Association football midfielders
FC Orenburg players
FC Dynamo Vologda players
Belarusian Premier League players